Karim Al Abed Darwich (born 2 November 1998) is a footballer who plays as a forward for  club Ansar and the Lebanon national team.

Club career

Early career 
Coming through the youth system, Darwich made his senior debut with Viktoria Berlin on 13 March 2017, as a 73rd-minute substitute in a 2–0 Regionalliga Nordost win against Carl Zeiss Jena in the 2016–17 season.

Darwich played for SV Altlüdersdorf in the Oberliga Nord during the 2017–18 season, making nine appearances and scoring twice.

Nejmeh 
On 3 January 2018, Darwich moved to Lebanese Premier League side Nejmeh; he scored two goals in five matches in the 2017–18 Lebanese Premier League.

Akhaa Ahli Aley 
Darwich joined Akhaa Ahli Aley on loan in summer 2018, with whom he played 18 league games and scored three times in the 2018–19 season. He was purchased by Akhaa for the 2019–20 season, scoring a goal in two games in the cancelled league season.

Darwich had a short loan experience at Ahed in February 2020, playing in the 2020 AFC Cup.

Ansar 
Darwich joined Ansar from Akhaa on 3 July 2020, in a deal worth $50,000. In the 2020–21 season, he helped Ansar win their first league title since 2007, and their 14th overall. Darwich also helped Ansar win the double, beating Nejmeh in the 2020–21 Lebanese FA Cup final on penalty shoot-outs.

International career 
Born in Germany, Darwich is of Lebanese descent. He played for the Lebanon U23s at the 2020 AFC U-23 Championship qualification. Darwich made his debut for the senior team in a friendly against Bahrain on 12 November 2020.

Career statistics

International

Honours 
Ansar
 Lebanese Premier League: 2020–21
 Lebanese FA Cup: 2020–21; runner-up: 2021–22
 Lebanese Super Cup: 2021
 Lebanese Elite Cup runner-up: 2022

See also 
 List of Lebanon international footballers born outside Lebanon

References

External links

 
 
 

1998 births
Living people
Footballers from Berlin
German people of Lebanese descent
Sportspeople of Lebanese descent
German footballers
Lebanese footballers
Association football forwards
FC Viktoria 1889 Berlin players
SV Altlüdersdorf players
Nejmeh SC players
Akhaa Ahli Aley FC players
Al Ahed FC players
Al Ansar FC players
Regionalliga players
Oberliga (football) players
Lebanese Premier League players
Lebanon youth international footballers
Lebanon international footballers